Gary Locke (born 1950) is a Chinese American politician and U.S. Ambassador to China.

Gary Locke may also refer to:

Gary Locke (director) (born 1949), founding director of the RCC Marching Tigers
Gary Locke (English footballer) (born 1954), English former footballer
Gary Locke (Scottish footballer) (born 1975), Scottish football manager and former footballer

See also
Gary Lauk (born 1940), lawyer and political figure in British Columbia
Gary Lock (fl. 1990s–2010s), British archaeologist